The Helsinki Lighthouse (Finnish: Helsingin majakka; also commonly known as Helsingin kasuuni — Swedish: Helsingfors fyra; Helsingfors kassun) is a caisson-type lighthouse located in the Gulf of Finland,  due south of West Harbour, Helsinki.

Further work was carried out the following year, and the lighthouse was officially commissioned in September 1959.

The tower has eight storeys, with the solar-powered 40W halogen light source on the top, and control and technical rooms as well as operator accommodation below. In 1984, a helipad was added on top of the tower.

The lighthouse is automated, and operated from the control room on the Harmaja islet.

There is a Finnish Meteorological Institute weather station located at the lighthouse.

See also

Harmaja lighthouse and pilot station

References

Lighthouses in Finland
Lighthouses completed in 1959
Buildings and structures in Helsinki
Water transport in Finland